A Gold Star Lapel Button  in the United States is an official decoration authorized by an Act of Congress that is issued to the direct next of kin family members of service members who died in World War I and World War II and subsequent armed hostilities in which the Armed Forces of the United States has been engaged.  The Gold Star Lapel Button was established by Act of Congress, Public Law 80-306, in August 1947.

Award criteria 
The issuance of the Gold Star Lapel Button for the next of kin consists the following time periods:
(1) World War I, April 6, 1917, to March 3, 1921;
(2) World War II, September 8, 1939, to July 25, 1947;
(3) United Nations action in Korea, June 27, 1950, to July 27, 1954;
(4) After June 30, 1958
(a) while engaged in an action against an enemy of the United States;
(b) while engaged in military operations involving conflict with an opposing foreign force;
(c) while serving with friendly foreign forces engaged in an armed conflict in which the United States is not a belligerent party against an opposing armed force.

The Department of Defense recognizes the following operations subsequent to June 30, 1958:
 Lebanon, July 1, 1958, to November 1, 1958
 Republic of Vietnam, July 1, 1958, to March 28, 1973
 Quemoy and Matsu Islands, August 23, 1958, to June 1, 1963
 Taiwan Straits, August 23, 1958, to January 1, 1959
 U.S. operations in direct support of the United Nations in the Congo, July 14, 1960, to September 1, 1962
 U.S. operations of assistance to the Republic of Laos, April 19, 1961, to October 7, 1962
 Berlin, August 14, 1961, to June 1, 1963
 Cuba, October 24, 1962, to June 1, 1963
 Congo, November 23, 1964, to November 27, 1964
 Dominican Republic, April 28, 1965, to September 21, 1966
 Korea, October 1, 1966, to June 30, 1974
 Cambodia, March 29, 1973, to August 15, 1973
 Thailand, March 29, 1973, to August 15, 1973
 Cambodia, April 11, 1975, to April 13, 1975
 Vietnam, 
 Mayaguez Operation, May 15, 1975
 Lebanon, June 1983 to
 Grenadan Operation, October 23, 1983, to November 21, 1983
 Operation Eldorado Canyon, April 2, 1986, to April 17, 1986
 Panama, December 20, 1989, to January 31, 1990
 Desert Shield/Desert Storm, August 2, 1990, to November 30, 1995
 Haiti, September 16, 1994, to March 31, 1995
 Somalia, December 5, 1992, to March 31, 1995
 Operations in the Persian Gulf, November 30, 1995, to (date to be determined)
 Operations in and around the Former Republic of Yugoslavia, December 20, 1996, to June 20, 1998, and any subsequent operations as may be announced by the Secretary of Defense.

One Gold Star Lapel Button will be furnished, without cost, to the widow, widower and to each of the parents (mother, father, stepmother, stepfather, mother through adoption, father through adoption and foster parents), children (step children and children through adoption), brothers, sisters, half brothers, and half sisters.

Appearance 
The Gold Star Lapel Button consists of a gold star on a purple circular background, bordered in gold and surrounded by gold laurel leaves. On the reverse is the inscription "United States of America, Act of Congress, August 1966" with space for engraving the initials of the recipient.

See also 
 Blue Star Mothers Club
 American Gold Star Mothers
 Gold Star Wives of America
 Purple Heart
 Service flag
 Yellow ribbon

References 

Military awards and decorations of the United States
United States military badges
Service lapel buttons